State Route 202 (SR 202) is 20.5 mile long north-south state highway in Decatur County, Tennessee, connecting Saltillo with Beacon via Decaturville.

Route description

SR 202 begins at an intersection with SR 69, just northeast of Saltillo. It heads north as Brooksie Thompson Road to pass through rural areas to have an intersection with SR 114. The highway continues to wind its way north to come to an intersection and become concurrent with US 641/SR 69. They then head north to enter Decaturville, where they bypass downtown to the west and have an intersection with SR 100. SR 202 then splits off onto Middleburg Road to leave Decaturville and head west to pass through wooded areas and farmland. It then has an intersection with SR 201, where it turns north along Beacon Road to cross a bridge over the Beech River and pass through the community of Beacon before coming to an end at an intersection with US 412/SR 20. The entire route of SR 202 is a two-lane highway.

Major intersections

References

202
Transportation in Decatur County, Tennessee